The La Liga play-offs are an annual series of football matches to determine the final promotion places within Segunda División and La Liga. In its current format, it involves the four teams that finish directly below the automatic promotion places from Segunda División to the top tier. These teams meet in a series of play-off matches to determine the final team that will be promoted. Reserve teams are not eligible for promotion.

The play-offs were first introduced in 1929 and have been staged at the conclusion of every season since. Until 1999, it consisted in games between teams from both leagues, but when it was reinstated, it only involved four teams from Segunda División.

Results

1929
The first edition of La Liga and Segunda División finished with a promotion/relegation playoff between the champion of Segunda División and the last qualified team of La Liga. It was played with a double-leg format and Racing Santander remained in the top tier.

1935–1936
In 1934, the Segunda División was expanded into three groups of 10 teams. The two first qualified teams of each group would play a final stage with a round-robin format. The two top teams, promoted to La Liga.

1940–1950
Just after the Spanish Civil War, the 1939–40 Segunda División was expanded into five groups where the winners joined the final stage. The champion promoted directly while the runner-up played a single-game to promote to La Liga.

In the next season, the Segunda División was reduced to two groups of 12 teams where the two top teams joined a final group. In this one, the winner and the runner-up promoted directly while the 3rd and 4th qualified played against the two last qualified teams in La Liga. The two winners achieved the spot for the top tier's next season. From 1945 (one year after the reduction of Segunda División to one only group) to 1947, there was only one promotion/relegation game.

All games were played in a neutral venue.

1951–1956
For the leagues of the 1950s, when the Segunda División was divided into two groups, a new promotion/relegation system was created. The second and third qualified of each group and the 13th and 14th of La Liga, played by 16 teams, joined a round-robin group where the two top teams would promote to the next La Liga season.

1959–1968
In 1958 the RFEF re-adopted the promotion/relegation play-offs system between teams from La Liga and Segunda División. Teams qualified in positions 13 and 14 of La Liga would face against the 3rd and 4th qualified in Segunda División. The two winners achieved the spot for the top tier's next season.

1987–1999
In 1987 the LFP, with the expansion of La Liga to 20 teams, re-adopted the promotion/relegation play-offs between teams from La Liga and Segunda División. This time, the 17th and 18th qualified teams in La Liga would face the 3rd and 4th position teams of Segunda División, excluding reserve teams. The two winners of the double-legged play-offs would get a place in the next La Liga season. This format worked until 1999, when the LFP removed it and determined that three teams will directly promote or relegate.

In 1997, for reducing the number of teams in La Liga from 22 to 20, there was only one play-off game between the 18th qualified in La Liga and the third one of Segunda.

In gold, teams from La Liga and in silver, teams from Segunda División.

2011–present
For the 2010–11 season, the Segunda División adopted the Football League play-offs format. While the two first qualified teams were directly promoted to La Liga's next season, teams qualified between third and sixth would take part in the play-offs. If a reserve team qualifies in one of these positions, its spot will be transferred to the next best qualified.

Fifth placed faces against the fourth, while the sixth positioned team faces against the third. The final is also two-legged. The best positioned team always plays at home on the second leg.

Since the second edition, a new rule was established: in case of a tied eliminatory there were extra time, once finished it, this season introduced that there would not be penalty shoot-out and the winner would be the best positioned team.

Notes

References

External links
LFP website

La Liga records and statistics
Segunda División records and statistics
Segunda División play-offs